Parmotrema apricum is a species of corticolous lichen in the family Parmeliaceae that is found in Africa. It was originally placed in the genus Parmelia by authors Krog and Swinscow in 1981. The holotype collection was made in the Machakos County, north of Kibwezi town in Kenya, where it was found growing on shrubs in a sun-exposed dry location. Two laters later, the authors transferred it to the genus Parmotrema.

The leathery thallus of Parmotrema apricum is bright yellow to yellow-green, comprising lobes that are 0.5–1 cm wide. Apothecia and pycnidia are not known for this species.

See also
List of Parmotrema species

References

apricum
Lichen species
Lichens described in 1981
Lichens of Kenya
Taxa named by Hildur Krog